Klyuch Bedeyevo (Bäźäyşişmä) is a rural locality (a village) in Krasnogorsky Selsoviet, Nurimanovsky District, Bashkortostan, Russia. The population was 100 as of 2010. There are 2 streets.

Geography 
Klyuch Bedeyevo is located 9 km north of Krasnaya Gorka (the district's administrative centre) by road. Novobiryuchevo is the nearest rural locality.

References 

Rural localities in Nurimanovsky District